Broomfield High School is a public high school in Broomfield, Colorado, part of the Boulder Valley School District.

History
In 1961, a junior and senior high school opened at 14th and Daphne to serve students within the newly incorporated city of Broomfield. High school classes at the school had begun in the fall of 1964. While remodeled several times in the intervening years, the original buildings are part of the present Broomfield High School. From June 2008 to August 2009, the school underwent an extensive $27 million renovation, where in most of the original junior high school portion of the school was replaced with a modern two-story structure.

Demographics
The demographic breakdown of the 1,605 students enrolled in 2016–17 was:
Asian: 3.7%
Black: 0.7%
American Indian/Alaskan Native: 0.5%
Hawaiian Native/Pacific Islander: 0.06%
Hispanic: 19.4%
White: 72.3%
Two or more races: 3.4%

Students eligible for free or reduced lunch: 15.5%

Notable alumni

Brandon Bailey , MLB Pitcher for the Houston Astros organization.
Gustav Olofsson , NHL Defenseman for the Montreal Canadiens organization.
Timothy Tymkovich (1975), federal judge

References

External links
 
 Boulder Valley School District

Educational institutions established in 1964
Public high schools in Colorado
Schools in Boulder County, Colorado
1964 establishments in Colorado